Palomares (Spanish for dovecotes) may refer to:

Places
 Palomares, Almería, Spain
 1966 Palomares B-52 crash
 Palomares del Río, Seville, Spain
 Palomares del Campo, Cuenca, Spain
 Palomares de Béjar, Salamanca, Spain

People
 Ramón Palomares (born 1935), Venezuelan poet

Other
Palacio del Marqués de Palomares (Seville)

See also
Palomar (disambiguation)